The  is a commuter electric multiple unit (EMU) train type operated by the private railway operator Kintetsu Railway since 2004.

Operations
The 7020 series sets operate on Keihanna Line services, including through-running to and from the Osaka Metro Chūō Line.

Formations

Interior
Passenger accommodation consists of longitudinal bench seating throughout.

External links
 Kintetsu 7020 series train information 

Electric multiple units of Japan
7020 series
Train-related introductions in 2004
750 V DC multiple units
Kinki Sharyo multiple units